or The Climber is a Japanese manga series written by Shin-ichi Sakamoto and Yoshirō Nabeda and illustrated by Sakamoto, based on a novel by Jirō Nitta. It was originally serialized in Shueisha's seinen manga magazine Weekly Young Jump from November 2007 to October 2012, with its chapters collected in 17 tankōbon volumes. It tells the story of introvert solo mountain climber Mori Buntarō—partially based on real-life mountain climber Buntarō Katō—who is introduced to sport climbing after being transferred to a new high school and later dedicates his entire life to professional mountain climbing, keeping the ascent of K2's East Face as his goal.

In 2010, Kokou no Hito won an Excellence Prize at the 14th Japan Media Arts Festival.

Synopsis
The story follows a lonesome and "gloomy" student named  and his journey from the discovery of his new passion, climbing, starting from a high school climbing club, to being a world class professional climber. Going through the different stages of his life dealing with loneliness, solo climbing, and depression, in pursue of his dream, conquering the most difficult mountain, K2.

Publication
Written by Shin-ichi Sakamoto and Yoshirō Nabeda and illustrated by Sakamoto, Kokou no Hito was serialized in Shueisha's seinen manga magazine Weekly Young Jump from 1 November 2007 to 27 October 2011. Shueisha collected its chapters in seventeen tankōbon volumes, released from 18 April 2008 to 18 November 2011.

Volume list

Reception
Kokou no Hito won an Excellence Prize in the Manga Division at the 14th Japan Media Arts Festival in 2010. It also won the Best Seinen Manga category at the 2011 Prix Mangawa Awards.

References

External links

2007 manga
Mountaineering in anime and manga
Shueisha manga
Seinen manga